Poplar Creek Public Library District is a public library in Illinois, United States which serves residents of Streamwood, Hanover Park, Elgin, Schaumburg, and Bartlett. Created by a 1966 referendum in Streamwood, it currently has one main Streamwood facility and one Hanover Park branch. It serves 66,000 residents, though many of its towns are served only in-part by Poplar Creek, with other residents being patrons of the Schaumburg Township District Library, Gail Borden Public Library District, or the Bartlett Public Library District.

Poplar Creek Library became a United States Federal and State document depository in 1980. Its collection contains approximately 160,000 books 19,000 other items. It is a member of the DuPage Library System.

In 2009, an expansion and renovation of the facility was designed by Lonn Frye and AJ Rosales of Frye Gillan Molinaro Architects. This expanded facility has been the recipient of a 2009 GE Edison Award of Merit, a 2010 AIA Chicago Design Excellence Award for Interior Architecture, and it was also awarded the title of #1 New Landmark Library in May 2011 by Library Journal Magazine.

The Sonya Crawshaw Branch Library in Hanover Park was completely renovated and expanded in 2013. Itasca, IL based Williams Architects was the architect for the project.

See also
DuPage Library System

Notes

References
"Poplar Creek Public Library District". Find-It! Illinois. Accessed 2 March 2005.
"Libraries, Streamwood, Illinois (IL)". Village of Streamwood, 30 September 2004.
"Libraries, Hanover Park, Illinois (IL)". Village of Hanover Park, 28 February 2005.
"Streamwood Libraries and Schools". Streamwood Chamber of Commerce. Accessed 2 March 2005.

External links
Poplar Creek Public Library, its official website
Young Adult Book Blog

Libraries in Cook County, Illinois
Library districts in Illinois
1966 establishments in Illinois
Government agencies established in 1966
Public libraries in Illinois